Ammonium selenide is a chemical compound with the symbol (NH4)2Se. It is a white solid, however selenium impurities make it appear black.

Preparation
It was first claimed to be prepared in 1898 by reacting concentrated ammonia and hydrogen selenide gas. However, this has been disproved in 1926 as it was shown that ammonium selenide was unstable in water. Instead, ammonium selenide was produced by the reaction of anhydrous ammonia and hydrogen selenide gas(made from the reaction of iron(II) selenide and hydrochloric acid). However, there is no X-ray crystallography on this compound.

Reactions
Ammonium selenide reacts with water and various acids. For example, it reacts with nitric acid to form selenic acid:
(NH4)2Se + 4HNO3 + H2O → H2SeO4 + 3NH4NO3

References

Ammonium compounds
Selenides